The following is a list of people from the Toronto suburb of Scarborough, Ontario.

Athletes

 Michael Bunting, NHL player
 Brad Aitken NHL hockey player
 Denham Brown, professional basketball player
 Jeff Cowan, NHL player
 Clifton Dawson, NFL football player
 Andre De Grasse, track and field athlete
 Jonathan de Guzman, Eredivisie professional soccer player
 Dwayne De Rosario, MLS soccer player
 Ben Johnson, sprinter
 George Kottaras, MLB baseball player
 Larissa Lowing (born 1973), artistic gymnast
 Jamaal Magloire, NBA basketball player
 Kamal Miller, professional soccer player
 Cindy Nicholas, swimmer
 Paul Peschisolido, retired soccer player, current manager of Burton Albion F.C.
 Cherie Piper, member of the Canadian national women's ice hockey team
 Mike Ricci, NHL player
 Wayne Simmonds, NHL player
 Devante Smith-Pelly, NHL player
 Natalie Spooner, member of the Canadian national women's ice hockey team
 Anthony Stewart, NHL player
 Rick Tocchet, NHL player
 Tyler Toffoli, NHL player
 Paul Tracy, race car driver
 Ron Tugnutt, NHL player
 Joseph Valtellini, kickboxer
 Laura Walker, curler
 Kevin Weekes, NHL player
 Peter Zezel, NHL player
 Bobby Roode, wrestler

Media

 Eric Bauza, voice actor and comedian
 Sugar Lyn Beard, television/voice actress, host, and TV/radio personality
 Gerry Dee, actor, comedian
 Andy Donato, editorial cartoonist for the Toronto Sun newspaper
 Merella Fernandez, television anchor and reporter
 Melyssa Ford, model and actress
 David Furnish, filmmaker and civil partner of Elton John
 Rishi James Ganjoo, singer in Danko Jones
 Nicole Holness, TV host, R&B singer
 Henry Lau, singer in Super Junior-M
 Doris McCarthy, artist
 Eric McCormack, actor
 Mike Myers, comedian known for his portrayal of Austin Powers
 Alan Park, comedian who starred in Royal Canadian Air Farce
 Jasmine Richards, actress
 Craig Russell, actor and female impersonator
 Domee Shi - animator, director of Turning Red
 Cassie Steele, actor
 Mark Taylor, actor
 Michael Wincott, actor
 Lilly Singh, YouTube personality
 Steve Dangle,  Canadian sports analyst, comedian, author, and internet personality
 Stephan James, actor
 Shamier Anderson, actor

Musicians

 Barenaked Ladies, popular alternative rock band
 Boi-1da, hip hop producer
 BrassMunk, hip hop group
 Choclair, rapper
 Deborah Cox, R&B singer-songwriter, actress
 Fefe Dobson, rock singer and songwriter
 Goddo, rock band
 Joe Cash, singer/songwriter
 Lawrence Gowan, solo artist and keyboard player/singer of Styx
 Kardinal Offishall, rapper
 Glenn Lewis, R&B singer and songwriter
 Maestro, rapper and actor
 More or Les, rapper, DJ and producer
 Nineteen85, hip hop producer and songwriter
 Carole Pope, singer/songwriter
 Saukrates, rapper
 Lisa Shaw, house and soul singer-songwriter
 Slaughter, thrash metal band
 The Ugly Ducklings, 1960s rock band
 The Weeknd, singer/songwriter
 Deryck Whibley, singer/songwriter and guitarist of Sum 41
 Francesco Yates, singer/songwriter
 k-os, rapper
 Bedouin Soundclash, alternative rock band
 Monolith, Hip Hop group
 IRS, Hip Hop group

Others

 Paul Bernardo, serial rapist and murderer
 Shary Boyle, artist
 Lenna Bradburn, public sector executive, first female Canadian police chief
 David Chariandy, novelist
 Bill Hastings, former Chief Censor of New Zealand now Chief Justice of Kiribati
 Luka Magnotta, Canadian porn actor and murderer 
 Jay Manuel, creative director for America's Next Top Model and host of its Canadian counterpart
 Jayde Nicole, Playboy playmate
 David Onley, Lieutenant Governor of Ontario
 Beryl Potter, disability rights activist
 Monika Schnarre, supermodel
 Jagmeet Singh, MP and leader of the New Democratic Party
 Fred and Norah Urquhart, entomologists who discovered the migration route of monarch butterflies

References

Scarborough